Sigurd Gunnarson Helle (6 September 1920 – 21 April 2013) was a Norwegian topographer and explorer.

He was born in Hylestad. He graduated from the University of Oslo with the cand.mag. degree in 1948. He was a research assistant for Carl Størmer, and was hired as a geodesist at the Norwegian Polar Institute in 1949. He did field work at Jan Mayen and Svalbard, but is best known for leading the Sixth Norwegian Antarctic Expedition to Queen Maud Land in 1956–1960. He retired in 1987.

The Helle Slope and the Sigurd Knolls in Antarctica are named for him. Hellefonna, a glaciated area in Sabine Land at Spitsbergen, is also named after Helle.

References

1920 births
2013 deaths
People from Valle, Norway
University of Oslo alumni
Norwegian geodesists
Norwegian polar explorers
Explorers of Antarctica
Norwegian topographers